Zhang Nuanxin (27 October 1940-28 May 1995) was a Chinese film director, and a leading figure of the Fourth Generation of Chinese directors.

Her most famous film The Drive to Win won the 2nd Golden Rooster special awards. Nuanxin Zhang is also best known for her films Sacrifice of Youth, A Yunnan Story. 

Chinese film theorist, the doctoral supervisor of Peking university Jinhua Dai, argues that she is not only a film director but also a film theorist. Her journal article The Film Language' s Modernization which she co-authored with her husband Li Tuo, is being considered as the manifesto of new era Chinese cinema. Another film theorist, Zhenqin Zhang, argues that she is the pioneer of Chinese film realistic aesthetics and Chinese women cinema.

Early life and Education 

Nuanxin Zhang was born in Inner Mongolia, China. Her parents were doctors, and her family was from Tie Ling, Liao Ning, China. In 1943, Nuanxin Zhang moved with her parents to Beijing, China. She was raised in Beijing.

In 1958, Nuanxin Zhang graduated from the High School Affiliated to Renmin University of China and began studying at the Beijing Film Academy. 

In 1962, Zhang graduated and later returned as a professor at the department of directing. She married the famous Chinese writer Li Tuo the same year. Zhang kept teaching at the Beijing Film Academy until 1972. 

In 1974, she started working in Shanghai Film Studio where she began a career in filmmaking.

Because she studied at the Beijing Film Academy around the 1960s but started making films in the 1970s, she is considered as a Chinese fourth-generation film director.

1974-1979 Early career
In 1979, she joined the Shanghai Film Studio and began her career as a director's assistant. She worked with famous directors such as  Hu Sang and Xie Jin, the leading figure of Chinese third-generation film directors. She began to gain experience as a film maker when working on The second spring (1974) and ChunMiao (1975).

Three years later, she began working with Yao Shuping and her husband Li Tuo on her first film script Li Siguang (1979). That same year co-authored an article called The Modernization of the Language of Film with her husband which was published  Film Arts the most famous Chinese film academic journal. Chinese film theorist Dai Jinhua argues that The Film Language ' s Modernization is the manifesto of new era Chinese cinema.

Film director

1980s
1981, Nuanxin Zhang directed her first film The Drive to Win (1981), and it won her a Golden Rooster special director awards, best recording awards. Chinese Ministry of Culture also gives The Drive to Win the outstanding film award. The Drive to Win was met with critical acclaim, bringing Zhang to the forefront of the Chinese art directors. Because of the success of the film The Drive to Win, Zhang wrote the book which is The Drive to Win— from script to film and this book published by China Film Press in December 1983. In 1984, Zhang starts to planning the film Sacrifice of Youth (1985), this film is adapted from the novel A beautiful place  which wrote by Manling Zhang, and it finished in 1985. In 1987, Zhang Nuanxin with French director Jacques Dorfmann co-directed the film Le Palanquin des Larmes (1987). In 1988, Nuanxin Zhang plans to adapted famous Chinese author Wang Shuo's novel Playing for Thrills and finished the film script. Eventually, she didn't finish it.

1990s
The 1990s, Zhang Nuanxin made her most important films. In 1990, Nuanxin Zhang directs the film Good Morning, Beijing (1990), won the Hong Kong International Film Festival Best Film from Mainland and Taiwan awards. The actors in this film Wang Quanan, Ma Xiaoqing, Jia Hongsheng become the leading figures of Chinese six-generation film director.

1993, Nuanxin Zhang directs film A Yunnan Story (1993), and this film acted famous actor Pu Cunxin. 1994: South China (1994) is Zhang Nuanxin's last film, which she directed in 1994. On May 28, 1995, Nuanxin Zhang died in Beijing because of cancer. Her funeral was held on June 3, famous Chinese author Wang Zengqi wrote her an elegiac couplet.

Style and influences
Zhang's film treats themes of alienated youth, contemporary Chinese history, as well as her signature usage of the long-take, color digital video, and his realist style. Chinese film theorist Zhang Zhenqin argues thatNuanxin Zhang's work speaks to a vision of "authentic" Chinese life. The Drive to Win, in particular, Zhang tells a story about women, about a normal female volleyball athlete(Sha Ou Played by Shanshan Chang)'s life, even Sha ou has been going through the team lose world champion and her husband's death, but her still facing her life optimistic. She represents a generation who was living in that period. So Chinese film theorist Zhang Zhenqin argues that she is the pioneer of Chinese film realistic aesthetics, and Chinese women cinema. And because The Drive to Win represents a generation and women's life who living in that period, this film is being considered as Zhang Nuanxin's most important.

Writing

The Film Language ' s Modernization
The film language ' s modernization (1979) which she co-authored with her husband Li Tuo, is being considered as the manifesto of new era Chinese cinema. Chinese film critic Yao Shuguang argues that: there is a golden age in from the late 1970s to mid-1980s, it was not only the golden age of Chinese filmmaking but also the era of Chinese film theory development. At that time, film theory at certain extent affects and dominate the creation of film. The film language ' s modernization which co-written by Zhang Nuanxin and Li Tuo is the representative texts of the time. The film language ' s modernization argues that: the filmmaking should no longer revolve around the politician but return to creating film itself.

Shuguang Yao also argues the limation of The film language's modernization which is this article admire Bazin's long-shot theory without careful analysis and reflection.

Filmography

Film

References

External links
 https://contemporary_chinese_culture.academic.ru/954/Zhang_Nuanxin on Enacademic
 https://variety.com/1995/scene/people-news/zhang-nuanxin-99129575/ on Variety

Film directors from Inner Mongolia
Chinese women film directors
Chinese film critics
1940 births
1995 deaths
People from Hohhot